Shadow of China is a 1989 drama film directed and co-written by Mitsuo Yanagimachi and starring John Lone, Sammi Davis and Vivian Wu.  It is based on the novel Snake Head by Masaaki Nishiki. It was the first Japanese-American co-production financed entirely in Japan, and the first English-language film by director Yanagimachi.

Plot summary
A Chinese political refugee tries to make his way to the top as a businessman in Hong Kong, while his former radicalism is transformed into cynicism. His past comes back to haunt him.

Cast

John Lone as Henry
Kōichi Satō as Akira
Sammi Davis as Katharine
Vivian Wu as Moo-Ling
Roland Harrah III as Xiao Niu
Roy Chiao as Lee Hok Chow
Constantine Gregory as Jameson
Colin George as Burke
Kenneth Tsang as Mr. Lau
Dennis Chan as Mr. Wu
Frédric Mao as Chi Fung
Simon Yam as Po Kok
Junko Takazawa as Phantom Mother
Justina Vail as Caroline
Sam Neill as John Dermot

References

External links
 
 

Japanese drama films
American drama films
Films based on Japanese novels
Films directed by Mitsuo Yanagimachi
1980s English-language films
1980s American films
1980s Japanese films